Pucajasa (possibly from Quechua puka red, q'asa mountain pass, "red pass") is a  mountain in the Vilcanota mountain range in the Andes of Peru. It is situated in the Cusco Region, Canchis Province, Pitumarca District. Pucajasa lies west of Cóndor Tuco. The Killitamayu flows along its slope.

References

Mountains of Peru
Mountains of Cusco Region